The 1891 Martinique hurricane, also known as Hurricane San Magín, was an intense major hurricane that struck the island of Martinique and caused massive damage. It was the third hurricane of the 1891 Atlantic hurricane season and the only major hurricane of the season. It was first sighted east of the Lesser Antilles on August 18 as a Category 2 hurricane. The storm made landfall on the island of Martinique, where it caused severe damage, over 700 deaths and at least 1,000 injuries. It crossed eastern Dominican Republic while tracking on a northwestward direction on August 19–20, passed the Mona Passage on August 20 and the Bahamas on August 22–23. It crossed the U.S. State of Florida and dissipated in the Gulf of Mexico after August 25. Total damage is estimated at $10 million (1891 USD). The storm is considered to be the worst on Martinique since 1817.

Meteorological history

That night, the hurricane passed over Martinique, lashing the island for four continuous hours. It is reported that numerous people suffered deafness on the island during the passage of the storm, believed to be a result of drastic decreases in barometric pressure. Around midnight on August 21, the cyclone passed north of Grand Turk of the Turks and Caicos Islands. During the late afternoon and into the evening hours there, frequent rain squalls occurred, and at 10:15 pm a strong gust of wind was reported. After that gust, the winds decreased in intensity, until around 12:00 am when winds picked up from the west. By 8:00 am the next morning, the wind had become south, and rain was steadily falling on the island.

Back on a northwestward track, it continued to weaken, and tracked through the Bahamas on August 22. The center of the storm was reported to have tracked directly over Crooked Island, Bahamas. Beginning on August 23, a ridge of high pressure was situated off the southeast coast of the United States. Now a Category 1 hurricane, the ridge of high pressure prevented the storm executing a recurve to the north or northeast. Instead, it tracked over the Florida Peninsula as a tropical storm, making landfall near Homestead on August 24. Subsequently, it moved into the Gulf of Mexico, where it officially dissipated on August 25. However, there were reports of a cyclonic disturbance in the east Gulf of Mexico until August 29.

Impact
On Martinique, the storm struck the east side of the island at about 6:00 pm. Throughout the storm, frequent lightning occurred. Houses, crops and trees across the entire island were obliterated. Especially, the loss of coffee, sugar and cotton crops had a large effect on Martinique's economy. At Ducos, it is noted that only four homes remained following the storm, and at St. Pierre, at least 34 people lost their lives. At Fort de France, the main part of the hospital collapsed, crushing to death two artillery men. Also, a military camp in Balata was destroyed, where houses comprising the campus suffered from severe roof damage. A number of soldiers there sustained injuries from airborne wood blanks and beams. All vessels at harbors were lost during the hurricane.

Initially, the total number of fatalities was placed at sixty. Later, 118 were reported dead in coastal locations alone. Even after the storm, finding an exact number of casualties was difficult because all roads in and out of interior sections of the island were impassable, blocked by downed trees and large amounts of washed out soil and rock. For a final death toll, the August 1891 Monthly Weather Review states that 700 perished in the storm. However, some newspapers report that the passage of the cyclone resulted in at least 1,000 deaths in Martinique. Additionally, another 1,000 people sustained injuries of one form or another as a direct result of the cyclone. Total damage is estimated at $10 million (1891 USD).

Elsewhere, when the hurricane passed north of Grand Turk, three people drowned on the island, and there was some damage to small houses and shipping vessels. In the U.S. State of Florida, it hit near Homestead as a minimal hurricane, blowing boats onshore near present-day Cutler, though due to lack of observations near the landfall location its impact in the state is largely unknown.

See also

List of Atlantic hurricanes

References

Further reading

1891 in the French colonial empire
Tropical cyclones in 1891
1890s Atlantic hurricane seasons
August 1891 events
Category 3 Atlantic hurricanes
Hurricanes in the Windward Islands
Hurricanes in the Leeward Islands
Hurricanes in Martinique
Hurricanes in Dominica
19th century in Martinique